Agniv Pan (born 1 January 1997) is an Indian cricketer. He made his first-class debut for Bengal in the 2016–17 Ranji Trophy on 13 October 2016. He made his List A debut for Bengal in the 2016–17 Vijay Hazare Trophy on 15 March 2017. He made his Twenty20 debut on 9 November 2019, for Bengal in the 2019–20 Syed Mushtaq Ali Trophy.

References

External links
 

1997 births
Living people
Indian cricketers
Bengal cricketers
People from Paschim Medinipur district